State Highway 25 (SH 25)  is a state highway in north Texas, running from Windthorst north to the Red River near Haynesville.

History

SH 25 was one of the original 25 Texas highway routes proposed on June 21, 1917. The original route was to be from Henrietta to Meridian. On August 21, 1923, all of SH 25 south of Mineral Wells was cancelled. On February 18, 1924, the section from Jacksboro to Henrietta was cancelled, and SH 25 had been rerouted to Archer City. On August 11, 1926, SH 25 extended north to Oklahoma. The route south of Jacksboro became a portion of SH 24 by 1929. On June 24, 1931, the route south of Windthorst became a portion of SH 66, changing it to its current route, with a toll bridge crossing across the Red River into Oklahoma. This crossing is no longer present.

Branches
SH 25A was a branch designated on April 27, 1925 from Antelope via Henrietta to Oklahoma. On March 19, 1930, the route was renumbered as SH 148.

Major intersections

References

025
Transportation in Archer County, Texas
Transportation in Wichita County, Texas